The Chambani by-election was a by-election held for the Tanzanian parliamentary constituency of Chambani. It was triggered by the death of Salim Khamis, the previous Member of Parliament (MP) who had held the seat for the Civic United Front (CUF) since 2010. The by-election took place on 16 June 2013 and the CUF candidate won by a landslide.

Results

References

By-elections in Tanzania
2013 elections in Tanzania
June 2013 events in Africa